Dharshan Kanjania (born 15 October 1989) is an Indian former cricketer. He played one first-class match for Delhi in 2009.

See also
 List of Delhi cricketers

References

External links
 

1989 births
Living people
Indian cricketers
Delhi cricketers
Cricketers from Delhi